Graveyard Keeper is a graveyard-themed management simulation video game developed by independent Russian indie game studio Lazy Bear Games and published by tinyBuild. The game's alpha version was released for Microsoft Windows in May 2018, followed by the regular release for Windows and Xbox One later that year. Versions for the Nintendo Switch and PlayStation 4 were released on June 27, 2019. It was released in Japan on February 6, 2020.

Gameplay
Graveyard Keeper is a graveyard-keeping management simulation game inspired by Stardew Valley and based on Harvest Moon. At the start of the game, the player becomes the recipient of a plot of land including a small graveyard once owned by his predecessor near a small town. The cemetery plot is initially overrun with boulders, trees, stumps, and weeds, and the player must work to clear them in order to restart its operation, tending to graves and even the church so as to generate revenue and bring donations to church coffers. Your ultimate goal is to get your character to open a portal back to his old world. To that end, you need information and help from various NPCs, whom you will be trying to please them, or do their quests. Such quests usually involves gameplay elements like bringing them some crafted or collectable items like oil, honey etc. More gameplay elements and areas slowly unlock throughout the game as you unlock new technologies. The skill tree in this game is called a Technology Tree, and you unlock new technologies to progress in the game. Beyond the early game, Graveyard Keeper requires you to have three different types of experience points: Red, Blue, and Green to unlock most of the technologies. Other than tending to graves and clearing out environmental elements, the game also has farming, smithing, rudimentary combat, multi-level dungeon, fishing, and an extensive crafting system.

Story
The player takes the role of a person hit by a car and awakes to find himself in an unfamiliar world with medieval fantasy setting where he is tasked with taking care of the local cemetery and church. Determined to return home and reunite with his lover, the graveyard keeper interacts with the locals while helping with their problems. Eventually, the keeper learns of a portal that can be used to get back home, but needs some special magic items to make it work, which are in possession of some of the village's most influential characters. After earning their trust and obtaining the items, the keeper bids farewell to his friends but instead of returning him home, the portal brings his lover to his side instead. Extra DLC content reveals that the keeper can't return home because he (just like his predecessors) has the sacred task of acting as an intermediary between the village's inhabitants and the afterlife and it was revealed that the Ancient God brought him here and split him in two: His aggressive side is sent to the Town while his compassionate side had his memory wiped of what happened to him recently and was assigned to become the new graveyard keeper for the village (This is also why he cannot enter the town and dies every time he attempts to do so).

DLC 
The DLC for Graveyard Keeper, "Breaking Dead" was announced in 2018 free for owners of the base game. A resurrection table is added to your morgue, and you can reanimate corpses and set them to work on any of the many ongoing tasks that fuel your enterprise, from gathering stone and wood, to crafting items and writing books, as well as taking care of your garden and hauling merchandise to market. With enough zombies of high enough quality, it becomes possible to automate your entire supply chain, leaving you free to focus on progressing through the main storyline.

A second, paid DLC called "Stranger Sins" was released on October 28, 2019 (just in time for Halloween), which delves further into the game's lore and characters. It introduces a new Tavern for you to manage by producing and selling food and drink in large quantities at excellent prices, and an entirely new quest-chain which adds personalities to many of the previously-silent villagers. It also adds a new ending for completing the main game after finishing the DLC questline.

A third, paid DLC called "Game of Crone" was released in October 27, 2020 with additional story content. It features a camp of refugees from the Inquisition the player must help to develop while investigating the mystery of a vampire terrorizing the villagers. It also includes a side-quest involving the donkey that brings the corpses enlisting the player's help on his plan to start a communist revolution.

A fourth, paid DLC called "Better Save Soul" was released on October 28, 2021. It offers the chance for the player to investigate the sins of the corpses brought to them. With the help of a new shady friend, Euric, and an amnesiac half-ghost Smiler, the player must remove the sins from the living and dead alike. This DLC also offers new ways to improve the quality of corpses and adds remote control to some of the crafting stations.

References

External links
 

2018 video games
Android (operating system) games
Construction and management simulation games
Indie video games
iOS games
Lazy Bear Games games
Linux games
MacOS games
Nintendo Switch games
PlayStation 4 games
Portal fantasy
Single-player video games
TinyBuild games
Video games developed in Russia
Video games set in cemeteries
Windows games
Xbox One games